Pursuit of Happiness is an American sitcom that aired from October 30, 1987 until January 8, 1988.

Premise
A history professor gets a job at a small college in Philadelphia.

Cast
Paul Provenza as Asst. Prof. David Hanley
Brian Keith as Professor Roland G. Duncan
Judie Aronson as Sara Duncan
Wendel Meldrum as Margaret Callahan
Wesley Thompson as Vernon Morris
Magic Johnson as himself
Kevin Scannell as Thomas Jefferson
Wanda De Jesus as Mrs. Lopez

Episodes

References

External links
 
 

1987 American television series debuts
1988 American television series endings
1980s American sitcoms
English-language television shows
American Broadcasting Company original programming
Television shows set in Philadelphia
Television series by 20th Century Fox Television